"Again" is the first single by Flyleaf from their second album, Memento Mori. It was announced on July 29, 2009, that "Again" would be hitting radio August 25, 2009. The song was added to the play lists on Flyleaf's official site and the band's official Myspace page on August 19, 2009. The song was officially available for digital download on August 25, 2009. It is also featured in iPhone
application Tap Tap Revenge 2, is downloadable content for Rock Band 2 and is a playable track in Guitar Hero: Warriors of Rock and Power Gig: Rise of the SixString.

Performances
The song debuted in early 2007 along with the song "Have We Lost" while Flyleaf was on tour, playing songs from their self-titled debut album Flyleaf. In mid-2009, the lyrics to the song changed, and lead singer Lacey Mosley explain why in a letter written to fans.

Music video
The music video for "Again" premiered on MTV on September 30, 2009. The director of the video is Meiert Avis. The woodcuts in the video were created by bassist Pat Seals, who also designed all the artwork for Memento Mori.

Letters from the Commander/History of Memento Mori
11.4.00 Again (Part Two of the History of Memento Mori)

As I looked over the battlefield today, I was reminded of what we were fighting for. I thought of all of my loved ones. When I started thinking about my daughter, I was overwhelmed. She can be so much like me...the way her heart breaks with every injustice. She prays like everything depends on God, but then lives like it all depends on her. Even though she’s strong, there are times when she tries to carry all the weight of the world on her own and she ends up crushed, brought to her knees. As she cries out for relief, she will finally let go, surrendering all of the burden by believing that everything has a purpose and will work out for good... It’s only here that she finds the air to breathe again. I wish she would come to this place quicker sometimes. So often she feels guilty for not being able to hold it all herself, but if she only knew how wonderful she is. I’ve written several times to remind her of these things, but I haven’t gotten a response in a month.

Charts

Weekly charts

Year-end charts

References 

2009 singles
Flyleaf (band) songs
Music videos directed by Meiert Avis
2009 songs
Song recordings produced by Howard Benson
A&M Octone Records singles